John Bulkeley (11 November 1614 – September 1662)  was an English politician who sat in the House of Commons  at various times between 1640 and 1662.

Bulkeley was the son of William Bulkeley of Burgate, Hampshire, and his wife Margaret Culliford, daughter of John Culliford of Encombe, Dorset.  He matriculated at Hart Hall, Oxford, on 13 April 1632, aged 18. He was a student of the Middle Temple in 1633. He travelled abroad in France from 1634 to 1637.

In April 1640, Bulkeley was elected Member of Parliament for Yarmouth (Isle of Wight) in the Short Parliament. He was elected to the Long Parliament in November 1645 as MP for  Newtown until he was excluded under Pride's Purge.

Bulkeley was elected MP for Hampshire  in 1654 for the First Protectorate Parliament and was re-elected for Hampshire in 1656 for the Second Protectorate Parliament. In 1659 he was elected MP for in the Third Protectorate Parliament and in 1660 was chosen again for Hampshire  in the Convention Parliament. He was lastly elected MP for Lymington in the Cavalier Parliament and sat until his death in 1662.

Bulkeley died at the age of 47.

Bulkeley married firstly by licence dated 4 January 1638, Anne Doddington, daughter of Sir William Doddington of Breamore, Hampshire and had two daughters. He married secondly after settlement dated June 1646, Elizabeth Trenchard  widow of Francis Trenchard of Cutteridge, Wiltshire and daughter of William Sotwell of Greenham, Berkshire. She died in March 1651 and he married thirdly after settlement dated 1652, Penelope Trenchard, daughter of Sir Thomas Trenchard of Wolverton, Dorset, and had three sons.

References

 
 
 
 
 

1614 births
1662 deaths
Alumni of Hart Hall, Oxford
Members of the Middle Temple
English MPs 1640 (April)
English MPs 1640–1648
English MPs 1654–1655
English MPs 1656–1658
English MPs 1659
English MPs 1660
English MPs 1661–1679
Members of Parliament for the Isle of Wight